Irukallummudi (ഇരുകല്ലുംമുടി) a lesser-known scenic cliff near Thodupuzha, in Kerala, India.

Location
Irukallummudi is located in Cheppukulam about 20 km from Thodupuzha. The place provides bird's eye view of Muttom Dam reservoir on one side and Ilaveezha Poonchira on the other.

External links
 Trek to Irukallummudi

Gallery

Hills of Kerala
Cliffs
Geography of Idukki district